In mathematics, Costa's minimal surface, is an embedded minimal surface discovered in 1982 by the Brazilian mathematician Celso José da Costa. It is also a surface of finite topology, which means that it can be formed by puncturing a compact surface. Topologically, it is a thrice-punctured torus.

Until its discovery, the plane, helicoid and the catenoid were believed to be the only embedded minimal surfaces that could be formed by puncturing a compact surface. The Costa surface evolves from a torus, which is deformed until the planar end becomes catenoidal. Defining these surfaces on rectangular tori of arbitrary dimensions yields the Costa surface. Its discovery triggered research and discovery into several new surfaces and open conjectures in topology.

The Costa surface can be described using the Weierstrass zeta and the Weierstrass elliptic functions.

References
  Ph.D. Thesis, IMPA, Rio de Janeiro, Brazil.
  Bol. Soc. Bras. Mat. 15, 47–54.
 

Differential geometry
Minimal surfaces
Articles containing video clips